Aksakovo Municipality is a municipality (obshtina) in Varna Province, Northeastern Bulgaria, located near the Bulgarian Black Sea Coast. It is named after its administrative centre – the town of Aksakovo.

In the southernmost parts of the area is the eastern end of Hemus motorway which is planned to connect the  port of Varna with the country capital – Sofia. Also there is situated Varna International Airport.

The municipality of Aksakovo at a glance 
Municipality Aksakovo is located in the eastern part of the Danube plain, occupies part of the Dobrudja plateau and small part of the valley of river Batova. It has direct access to the Black sea through 4 km stripe between Zlatni Piassatsi resort and Kranevo village. The municipality embraces 23 settlements with center the town of Aksakovo.

The strategic geographic position of Municipality Aksakovo combines transport connections on land, air and water. Through the territory of the municipality passes the highway Haemus connecting Varna with the capital Sofia. Very close are located the ports Varna West – 12 km., Varna East – 8 km. and Ferryboat complex – 6 km.

The civil airport for home and international transport is the second of importance in Bulgaria and is located on the territory of Municipality Aksakovo. In summer time charter flights connect the Airport Varna with all important airports in Europe and Asia.

The most important and constant transport connection is between the municipal center Aksakovo and Varna. By its well developed transport infrastructure Municipality Aksakovo is connected with the greatest resort complexes on the north Black sea coast – Zlatni Piassatsi, St. St. Constantine and Helena, Albena, Kranevo and Balchik. Near the municipality /on 6 km./ is located a Ferryboat complex and railway easing the contacts in the region with domestic and international partners.

Taking into account the close location of Aksakovo to the attractive tourist summer seaside resorts: St. St. Constantine and Helena, Zlatni Piassatsi and Albena, the municipality has all conditions for the growth of rural, hunting and sport tourism.

In the municipality territory parts of the nature park Zlatni Piassatsi, nature park Pobiti kamani and the area Batova are included.

Fully reconstructed and restored churches meet locals and guests from the country and abroad as well as they keep the Christian spirit in them.

The municipality is traditionally well developed agrarian region. The climate is especially good for the production of cereals and growth of vineyards. In the region of Aksakovo is located the greatest in the region greenhouse complex, where is employed on full-time year round basis an important part of the municipality population. The potential of agrarian lands is considered as priority for the economic growth of the municipality and one of the focuses is to lay the foundations of modern agricultural sector.

The favorable conditions in the municipality create opportunities for economic growth of certain sub-sectors as food industry, meat processing industry and ecologic agricultural production, as well as furniture and construction related materials.

Organizations 
The municipality of Aksakovo is  member of the Union of the Bulgarian Black Sea Local Authorities (UBBSLA). At the moment the organization unites 20 municipalities bordering the Bulgarian Black Sea Coast, namely: Avren, Aksakovo, Balchik, Beloslav, Burgas, Byala, Varna, Valchi dol, Dalgopol, Devnya, Dobrich, Dolni Chiflik, Kavarna, Malko Tarnovo, Nesebar, Pomorie, Primorsko, Suvorovo, Shabla and Tsarevo. The president of UBBSLA is the mayor of the municipality of AKsakovo, Eng. Atanas Stoilov.

Characteristics 
Land area: 
 Agricultural land: 58.7%
 Forestland: 24.9%
 Settlements and urban area: 5.2%
 Water area: 0.44% (3 rivers; 5 dams; 4 deep drillings with thermal water (30°C – 50°C))
 Area used for extraction of mineral resources and waste disposals: 0.14%
 Transport infrastructure and other infrastructure: 11.02%

Important information: Significant percentage of the forestland represents part of the National Park Zlatni pjasaci (Eastern part of the municipal territory).

Settlements 

Aksakovo Municipality includes the following 23 places (towns are shown in bold):

Demography 
The following table shows the change of the population during the last four decades.

Religion
According to the latest Bulgarian census of 2011, the religious composition, among those who answered the optional question on religious identification, was the following:

An overwhelming majority of the population of Aksakovo Municipality identify themselves as Christians. At the 2011 census, 85.7% of respondents identified as Orthodox Christians belonging to the Bulgarian Orthodox Church.

Local authorities 
The municipal council of Aksakovo is elected for a 4-year term. The council comprises 21 municipal councillors. The current President of the Municipal Council of Aksakovo is Ms. Svetlana Dobreva. The highest-ranking official in the municipal government is the mayor who is elected for a 4-year term. The current mayor of Aksakovo is Eng. Atanas Stoilov.

See also
Provinces of Bulgaria
Municipalities of Bulgaria
List of cities and towns in Bulgaria

References

External links
 Aksakovo Municipality info-website 

Municipalities in Varna Province